Traut is a surname. Notable people with the surname include:

Bill Traut (1929–2014), American jazz musician, rock music producer, manager and record label executive
Eric Traut, American software engineer and software emulation pioneer
Hans Traut (1895–1974), German general
Sascha Traut (born 1985), German footballer
Walter Traut (1907–1979), Austrian film producer and production manager